Audrey Jones may refer to:
Audrey Evelyn Jones (1929–2014), English teacher and campaigner for women's rights
Audrey Jones Beck (1924–2003), American art collector and philanthropist